Stuart Murray Clark (22 May 1899 – 12 June 1973) was a Liberal party member of the House of Commons of Canada. He was born in Harrow, Ontario and became a manager by career.

He was first elected at the Essex South riding in the 1935 general election and re-elected for successive terms there in 1940, 1945, 1949 and 1953. After completing his final term of federal office, the 22nd Canadian Parliament, Clark left the House of Commons and did not seek re-election in 1957. He died in 1973 and is interred at Colchester Memorial Cemetery.

References

External links
 

Members of the House of Commons of Canada from Ontario
Liberal Party of Canada MPs
People from Essex County, Ontario
1899 births
1973 deaths